The Cehennemağzı Caves are a cave system of three caves lined side by side, located in the Karadeniz Ereğli district of Zonguldak Province, northern Turkey. One of the caves, which was used as a church in early Christianity, is a show cave.

Overview
The cave system is located in the Uzunmehmet neighborhood of Karadeniz Ereğli, the region known in the Antiquity as the Acheron Valley. The caves are an archaeological site affiliated with the Ereğli Museum. There are three caves lined up side by side.

The caves
The first cave is arranged in two sections. In the first section, the floor is paved with a mosaic of original plants and geometric motifs. There are columns, capitals  and oil lamp niches. A small apse was opened on the eastern wall of the second section, and there are steps in front of it. 
This cave, which is a very old Christian church, was used as a secret place of worship in the first years of Christianity.

It is called the Koca Yusuf Cave by the local people.

The third cave is the largest in terms of area. Its floor is covered with groundwater. The manmade cave served as a water source cistern for the first and second caves.

Mythology
According to the Greek mythology , the Cehennemağzı Mağaraları (for "Hell's Mouth Caves") is the place, where the divine hero Herakles landed in the Land of the Dead to kidnap Cerberus, the hound of Hades, the god of the dead and the king of the underworld. These caves are known to be one of the two most important prophecy centers of antiquity. The other is in the Greek city of Delphi.

Show cave
The caves were opened to the public as a show cave in 2001. Also a religious tourism destination, the cave is  open for visiting between 9-19 hours local time. It is closed on Mondays and weekends. It was reported that a total of 26,853 tourists visited the caves in 2016.  In the first six months of 2018, the caves attracted about 13,000 domestic and foreign visitors. The number of visitors in the last five years totaled around 140,000.

References

Show caves in Turkey
Caves of Zonguldak Province
Tourist attractions in Zonguldak Province
Karadeniz Ereğli
2001 establishments in Turkey
Byzantine sites in Anatolia
Archaeological sites in the Black Sea Region
Cave churches
Ruined churches in Turkey